Legal act may refer to:

Legal transaction, means by which legal subjects can change the legal positions of themselves or other persons intentionally
Legislative act, e.g. an act of Parliament or act of Congress, a formal written enactment produced by a legislature
 a legal document, regulation, part of law.

See also
Legal action